Krasnaya Plesen (literally, red mold), is a Russian punk rock group based in Yalta, active from 1989 to this day and having released 71 full albums. The name of the band is a mockery on the term Krasnaya Presnya ( - Red Presnya). Presnya is a name of a neighbourhood in Moscow that saw uprisings during the Russian Revolution of 1905, and during the Soviet era was a popular name for factories and other organizations.

The group is known for its parodies of popular musical artists, especially from Russia, such as Ruki Vverh!, and the profane language used in many of its songs.

Frequent characters in the group's songs include Russian political figures such as Leonid Brezhnev and Mikhail Gorbachev, as well as made-up characters like Cheburator (a portmanteau of Cheburashka and Terminator), the rural metalhead Balalaykin and Corporal Srul'.

The group's members as of 2021 are Pavel Yatsyna (founder), Alexey Samartsev and Pavel Bezrukov.

Discography
1991 – Album number 1 (remastered and re-release on CD in 2009 called "Red Scum")
1992 – A snivel in the left ear (and remastered reissue on CD in 2007)
1993 – Hit in the balls (Partial remastering and reissue on CD in 2007)
1993 – Metalhead Balalaykin (Remastered and re-release on CD in 2000)
1994 – New Year's Eve (Remastered and re-release on CD in 2006)
1994 – Vampire Kasholkin (Remastered and re-release on CD in 2005)
1994 – Ballads. Part 1 (re-released in 1996 titled "Ballads and Lyrics")
1994 – Sadistic couplets (reissued in 1996 with the title "A little boy and the other pioneering couplets, and the remastered edition on CD in 2004)
1994 – Ninth delirium (Remastered and re-release on CD in 2005)
1995 – Kabzdets to Chinese planes (Remastered and re-release on CD in 2006 and 2009 titled "Our locomotive, or the Chynese don't fly")
1995 – Sleeping Beauty - part 1
1997 – Sleeping Beauty - part 2
1997 – THE BEST, mother fucka!
1997 – Professor Bibizinsky and size of Chinese sneakers
1998 – Cinderella
1998 – Battle of Kulikovo
1998 – Bulbets to "Titanic"
1998 – Red Flower
1999 – Phone Sex
1999 – UNION of popular parodies 717
1999 – The Tale of Tsar Saltan - 1
2000 – UNION of popular parodies 828
2000 – Eternal kaif
2000 – UNION of popular parodies 1000
2001 – The Adventures of Little Red Riding Hood
2001 – UNION of popular parodies 3003
2001 – Spanner for the cruiser "Aurora"
2001 – UNION of popular parodies 2002
2002 – The Tale of Tsar Saltan - 2
2002 – UNION of popular parodies 6006
2002 – ... you all
2002 – UNION of popular parodies 4004
2003 – Suck, pops!
2003 – UNION of popular parodies 7007
2003 – From the margins to the Kremlin
2004 – UNION of popular parodies 8800
2004 – Fly-Ssykatuha
2004 – Bulbulator
2004 – UNION of popular parodies 9900
2004 – With Symphony Orchestra
2005 – UNION of popular parodies XXX - Cold Twenty
2005 – UNION of popular parodies 1.000.000
2005 – UNION of popular parodies 5.000.000
2006 – Trilogy of Russian punk rock
2006 – UNION of popular parodies 16,000,000
2006 – 46th album
2007 – UNION of popular parodies of "Fried thirty"
2007 – Disco of the Corporal Srul
2007 – Ballads. Part 2
2008 – ZheZZZt
2008 – Kerosene
2009 – Default
2010 – Demotivators (not yet published)
2010 – Ballads (BEST)
2010 – UNION of popular parodies in 2010 (55 anniversary album)
2012 – 21.12.12

External links

Official website 
VK 

Russian punk rock groups
Soviet punk rock groups